Lord Dorchester Secondary School is a Thames Valley District School Board Secondary School located in the town of Dorchester, Ontario, part of the municipality of Thames Centre, in the county of Middlesex, in Ontario, Canada.

Although small when compared to urban secondary schools, Lord Dorchester is larger than many rural-area schools. The student population hovers in the range of 500 students. Lord Dorchester is a strong academic school (based on provincial test scores), but also offers a range of non-academic courses such as shop classes to go along with core subjects in mathematics, sciences, and the arts.  Lord Dorchester lacks sports teams which can draw students away from the school. The mascot of Lord Dorchester is the Canadian beaver.

The school 
Lord Dorchester Secondary School was constructed in 1961 and is named for Guy Carleton, 1st Baron Dorchester.

The current school grounds include a two-story school building with an attached cafeteria and a gymnasium, two auxiliary storage buildings, and a very large open field that accommodates school sports as well as community recreation.

Throughout the years, the school has undergone a series of renovations and upgrades. In the early 1990s, a state-of-the-art music room was built as an addition to the school. Over the summer of 2007 asbestos was removed and windows and exterior doors were upgraded. In the Spring of 2015 the library/learning commons was upgraded for a more student-friendly research environment.

Most classrooms in the school have newer desks, computers (laptops, tablets and Chromebooks) data projectors and Smart Boards. Only one wing of the school is air conditioned.

The school is surrounded by residential areas centrally located in the town of Dorchester, where a large percentage of the staff and students reside. Other students are bused in from surrounding communities such as Putnam, and Thorndale.

Academics 
LDSS is regarded as a strong community based school that repeatedly scores above average in London area, provincial and national tests in math and literacy.

Despite declining enrollment, the school offers a full academic program at par with most larger schools. There are a full range of academic and applied courses at all grade levels. The school has locally developed courses and extensive access to on-line/e-learning. LDSS also has a High Skills Majors program in Physical Education. Lord Dorchester also offers extensive and diverse co-op programs for students. Some students do medical research in labs at local London hospitals, while others work at local businesses developing skills for successful employment. Each year, a few students take Advanced Placement Exams, which offer them a chance to earn university credits in high school. Other students take advantage of attending community college (e.g. Fanshawe College and Lambton College) one day per week, in a program where they can earn college credits. Students keen on taking open programs, particularly in the arts, can transfer to other schools such as H.B. Beal Secondary School.

Manufacturing and computer technology 
The back of the school is home to an expansive technology wing with several large classrooms dedicated manufacturing and computer technology. On the main floor of the technology wing there are classrooms for automotive and engine repair, tool and die manufacturing, electronics, robotics and woodworking and cabinetry. On the upper floor there are computer labs which offer classes in accounting and business, programming and design, and keyboarding.

Sports and athletics 
Lord Dorchester has a large number of extracurricular sports and athletic programs. The school competes in the 'A' class under the Thames Valley Regional Athletic Association (TVRAA), the Western Ontario Secondary Schools Athletic Association (WOSSAA), and provincially under the Ontario Federation of School Athletic Associations (OFSAA). Most teams are run by faculty staff. Boys' and girls' teams participate in hockey, basketball, volleyball, soccer, golf, tennis, archery, badminton, wrestling, baseball/softball, track and field, and cross country running. The track and field team is a source of pride for the school due to recent successes at OFSAA (2nd Girls Team Overall in the 2014 Championships, 3rd 2016, 4 × 400 m Champions in 2014 and 2016) and WOSSAA (Girls Overall Champions in 2015 and 2016).

In the earlier years, Lord Dorchester Secondary School had a football team, although it is now defunct. Attempts to bring football, rugby, and swimming back to LDSS will depend on LDSS having more students.

The school's sports facilities include a gymnasium with a retractable partition, and a large outdoor green field with a non-regulation baseball diamond, a 400m oval gravel track, pole vault and long jump pits, a soccer field, as well as several miniature soccer pitches for young children in the community. The school's gymnasium can easily be configured into basketball, volleyball, and badminton courts. Some teams also use the local arena and arena gym for practices and games.

A weight room was a recent addition to the school's sports facilities and students can obtain a membership for a small fee.  The Run to the Fair is a local 5k road race with the proceeds from the race go to support efforts like the fundraising for the weight room.

Music, drama, clubs and community involvement 

In any given year, the school runs many clubs. These include the Yearbook, Robotics Team, Reach For The Top, and the Safe Schools Committee. In recent years, clubs have developed that support natural disaster relief, the environment and diversity.

In the past few years, Lord Dorchester has hosted and organized a "Relay for Life" campaign that has raised over $100,000 for cancer research. The organizing committee is primarily students who manage and fundraise for the community event that draws hundreds of participants.

Prior to most holiday seasons, students and staff participate in many efforts to make the times better for local citizens in need. One event is the "Scrooge Campaign", which involves students and staff collecting food donations from Thames Centre residents before Christmas.

Lord Dorchester has a strong music program that performs concerts for the community and for assessment. The choir and bands play at school events during the year and participate in Variety Is (a local TVDSB gala). Throughout the past decade, the Lord Dorchester Senior Concert Band has had extremely good success in the Kiwanis Music Festival. The ensemble has captured several division titles.

The school has an active and energetic Drama Club. In the past few years, the club has performed two shows per year.

Notable alumni

Charlie Stephens – Professional hockey
Glen Weir – CFL football
Elaine Goble – Canadian visual artist
Evelyn Hart – Royal Winnipeg Ballet
Boone Jenner – Columbus Blue Jackets
Chris Robinson – San Diego Padres, Canadian Olympic Team

See also
List of high schools in Ontario

References

Educational institutions established in 1961
High schools in Middlesex County, Ontario
1961 establishments in Ontario